Petar Trifunović (31 August 1910 – 8 December 1980) was a Yugoslav chess player, who has been awarded the international grandmaster title, and five times Yugoslav champion.

Chess career
Yugoslavia was for many years the world's second strongest chess nation. Trifunovic came third in the first Yugoslav championship (1935), second in the next championship, and won in 1945, 1946, 1947 (shared with Svetozar Gligorić), 1952, and 1961. The young Trifunovic was also an excellent scholar, obtaining a law degree in 1933, followed by a doctorate.

He had a reputation as an attacking player in the 1930s, when he was known as 'Typhoonovic'. Later, he concentrated more on positional play and defensive technique, his style becoming less adventurous but difficult to refute. As a result, he drew many games. For example, his drawn match with Miguel Najdorf at Opatija 1949 included ten drawn games (+1 −1 =10), and at Leipzig in 1965 he drew all 15 of his games.

His international tournament successes included: Zlín 1945 (first), Prague 1946 (tied for second after Najdorf), Lima 1950 (first), Cheltenham 1951 (tied for second after Gligorić), Belgrade 1954 (third after Bronstein and Matanović, but ahead of Gligorić and Petrosian). At Netanya 1961 he tied for first with Matulović and Czerniak. At Prague 1961 and Beverwijk 1962 he came outright first and at Sarajevo, also in 1962, third after Gligorić and Portisch. Trifunović tied for first with 10 players at the 1962 Oklahoma City Open after drawing with Ken Smith and drawing with Bob Potter, a little-known expert from Dallas. At Noordwijk in 1965 he finished second to Botvinnik (ahead of Flohr, Larsen and Donner).

FIDE awarded him the international master title in 1950 and the grandmaster title in 1953. He played for his country in seven Chess Olympiads between 1935 and 1962. His best individual result was the event held in his birthplace, Dubrovnik, in 1950. A score of 10/13 won him the board 3 gold medal.

Legacy

He popularised and subsequently had his name associated with a variation of Alekhine's Defence. The Trifunovic Variation is identified by the move 5...Bf5 as a counter to White's Four Pawns Attack (1.e4 Nf6 2.e5 Nd5 3.d4 d6 4.c4 Nb6 5.f4).

References

External links

Visa with photo 1953
Visa with photo 1955

1910 births
1980 deaths
Chess grandmasters
Chess Olympiad competitors
Yugoslav chess players
Chess theoreticians
Sportspeople from Dubrovnik
Serbs of Croatia
20th-century chess players